The Girardini is a tribe of killifishes from the "livebearer" family Poeciliidae, consisting of three genera and 10 species.  The tribe was originally delineated by Carl Leavitt Hubbs in 1924.

Genera
The genera classified in this tribe are:

 Carlhubbsia Whitley, 1951
 Girardinus Poey, 1854
 Quintana (genus) Hubbs, 1934

References

Poeciliidae